Metabotropic glutamate receptor 5 is an excitatory Gq-coupled G protein-coupled receptor predominantly expressed on the postsynaptic sites of neurons. In humans, it is encoded by the GRM5 gene.

Function 
The amino acid L-glutamate is the major excitatory neurotransmitter in the central nervous system and activates both ionotropic and metabotropic glutamate receptors.  Glutamatergic neurotransmission is involved in most aspects of normal brain function and can be perturbed in many neuropathologic conditions. The metabotropic glutamate receptors are a family of G protein-coupled receptors, that have been divided into 3 groups on the basis of sequence homology, putative signal transduction mechanisms, and pharmacological properties.  Group I includes GRM1 and GRM5 and these receptors have been shown to activate phospholipase C.  Group II includes GRM2 and GRM3 while Group III includes GRM4, GRM6, GRM7, and GRM8.  Group II and III receptors are linked to the inhibition of the cyclic AMP cascade but differ in their agonist selectivities.  Alternative splice variants of GRM8 have been described but their full-length nature has not been determined.

There has been extensive research into the role of mGluR5 in psychological disorders, such as addiction and anxiety. Emerging research strongly points to mGluR5 playing a direct role in the pathogenesis of alcohol use disorder in humans, showing intimate involvement in the development of behavioral sensitization towards ethanol in animal models.

Ligands
In addition to the orthosteric site (the site where the endogenous ligand glutamate binds) at least two distinct allosteric binding sites exist on the mGluR5. A respectable number of potent and selective mGluR5 ligands, which also comprise PET radiotracers, has been developed to date. Selective antagonists and negative allosteric modulators of mGluR5 are a particular area of interest for pharmaceutical research, due to their demonstrated anxiolytic, antidepressant and anti-addictive effects in animal studies and their relatively benign safety profile. mGluR5 receptors are also expressed outside the central nervous system, and mGluR5 antagonists have been shown to be hepatoprotective and may also be useful for the treatment of inflammation and neuropathic pain. The clinical use of these drugs may be limited by side effects such as amnesia and psychotomimetic symptoms, but these could be an advantage for some indications, or conversely mGluR5 positive modulators may have nootropic effects.

Agonists
 CHPG (2-amino-2-(2-chloro-5-hydroxyphenyl)acetic acid)
 Monellin
 Glutamate

Antagonists
 Lithium
 LY-344,545
 Mavoglurant
 Remeglurant
 SIB-1893
(RS)-MCPG

Positive allosteric modulators
 ADX-47273
 CPPHA
 VU-29: Ki = 244 nM, EC50 = 9.0 nM; VU-36: Ki = 95 nM, EC50 = 10.6 nM
 VU-1545: Ki = 156 nM, EC50 = 9.6 nM
 CDPPB (3-cyano-N-(1,3-diphenyl-1H-pyrazol-5-yl)benzamide)
 DFB (1-(3-fluorophenyl)-N-((3-fluorophenyl)methylideneamino)methanimine)

Negative allosteric modulators
 AZD9272
 Basimglurant
 Dipraglurant
 Fenobam
 GRN-529
 MPEP
 MTEP: more potent than MPEP
 Raseglurant
VU0424238 (Tamagnan's name)
GET73 (Fluvoxamine/Zafuleptine) type analog used to treat anxiety and alcoholism.

mGluR5 and addiction
Mice with a knocked out mGluR5 show a lack of cocaine self-administration regardless of dose. This suggested that the receptor may be intimately involved in integrating the rewarding properties of cocaine. However, a later study showed that mGluR5 knockout mice responded the same to cocaine reward as wild type mice demonstrated by a cocaine place-preference paradigm.  This evidence taken together shows that mGluR5 may be crucial for drug-related instrumental self-administration learning, but not conditioned associations.

See also 
 Metabotropic glutamate receptor

References

Further reading

External links 
 

Metabotropic glutamate receptors